Karl H. Striedieck II (born April 7, 1937 in Ann Arbor, Michigan) is a world record setting glider pilot, a member of the U.S. Soaring Hall of Fame, and an active Holocaust denier. He was an early pioneer of ridge soaring in the Ridge-and-valley Appalachians in the 1960s, ultimately setting nine world records flying gliders there. He was selected for the U.S. national soaring team 12 times, and won a silver medal in the world championships in 1978 and 1983.

Striedieck was a U.S. Air Force pilot from 1959 to 1962, flying the F-86 Sabre and F-102 Delta Dagger, then continued his military service  until 1981 in the Pennsylvania Air National Guard, where he transitioned to the A-7 Corsair II. A year before graduating from Pennsylvania State University in 1965, he started flying gliders when he and Bill Clark co-founded the Nittany Soaring Club, flying out of the former State College Air Depot. He has over 15,000 flying hours, with nearly half of that total in gliders.

Striedieck moved his home to the Eagle Field private airport on top of Bald Eagle Mountain, near State College, Pennsylvania in 1966.

As a child, Karl H. Striedieck was saved from drowning by his brother Daniel Striedieck. His brother later died when his sand cave collapsed.

World gliding records
 Out-and-return distance: 767.02 km, 3 March 1968, Eaglesville, Pennsylvania, Schleicher Ka 8B
 Out-and-return distance: 916.30 km, 7 November 1971, Eagle Field, Pennsylvania, Schleicher ASW 15
 Out-and-return distance: 1098.54 km, 15 October 1972, Eagle Field, Pennsylvania, Schleicher ASW 15
 Out-and-return distance: 1025.02 km, 7 October 1972, Eagle Field, Pennsylvania, Schleicher ASW 15
 Out-and-return distance: 1298.97 km, 17 March 1976, Lock Haven, Pennsylvania, Schleicher ASW 17
 Out-and-return distance: 1634.70 km, 9 May 1977, Lock Haven, Pennsylvania, Schleicher ASW 17
 Distance over a triangular course: 1362.68 km, 2 May 1986, Julian, Pennsylvania, Schleicher ASW 20B
 Free distance using up to 3 turn points: 1434.99 km, 12 May 1994, Port Matilda, Pennsylvania, Schleicher ASW 20B
 Straight distance to a declared goal: 1288.79 km, 18 April 1997, Eagle Field, Pennsylvania Schleicher ASW 27

Source: Fédération Aéronautique Internationale

Holocaust denial
Striedieck was active in denying and minimizing the atrocities of Nazi Germany.  Many of his Holocaust denying activities took place at Penn State University, close to his gliderport, Eagle Field.  He has published advertisements in Penn State's The Daily Collegian questioning the use of gas chambers during the Holocaust.  He has also handed out pamphlets published by the Institute for Historical Review at Penn State University a few times a year, often during Jewish holidays.  Striedieck enrolled in a Holocaust History class at Penn State University, where he promoted Holocaust denier views.  His experience taking a Holocaust History class at Penn State University was the basis for an Institute for Historical Review article by Mark Weber, a former member of the Nazi National Alliance, and prominent Holocaust denier.  His Holocaust denying activities have resulted in debate regarding the appropriateness of Penn State University providing police protection for his  expression of free speech, as well as the appropriateness of The Daily Collegian accepting paid Holocaust denying advertisements.

Striedieck's Nazi-sympathizing activities have spilled over into his soaring life.  This includes hosting Hanna Reitsch, Nazi Germany's most famous female aviator, at Eagle field in 1979.

Striedieck grew up in a Nazi-sympathizing household.  His father, Dr. Walter Striedieck, a German instructor at University of Michigan, visited Nazi Germany in 1937.  Dr. Striedieck's presentation to Deutscher Verein was described in an article in The Michigan Daily.   Dr. Striedieck reports "the majority of people seem wholeheartedly in favor of Hitler" and "although most Germans appear to favor Hitler, there are a good many under-cover Communists even in the ranks of the Storm Troopers."

Other flying accomplishments 

 Smirnoff Derby Twice, won 1978
 SSA Contest Rules Committee Chairman 1992–2004
 Contest Organizer/Manager 18 times
 Lilienthal Medal 1971
 Lincoln Award 1986
 Exceptional Achievement Award 1972, 1977, 1986, 1994, 1997
 U.S. Standard Class Trophy 1973, 1980, 1981, 1992, 1996;
 U.S. Schreder 15M Trophy 1977, 1980, 1983, 1987, 1989, 1996, 1999, 2001
 Giltner Trophy 1988, 1989, 1993, 1999, 2001
 Hilton Cup 1989
 du Pont Trophy 1990
 Kubly Standard Trophy 1991, 1992, 1993, 1990
 Gomez Trophy 1999
 Lattimore Trophy 1999
 Hatcher Trophy 2001
 FAI 1000 K Diploma #5 (Int #8) 1972

Source: Soaring Hall of Fame

References 

Aviation pioneers
Aviators from Michigan
Glider pilots
Gliding in the United States
Glider flight record holders
Lilienthal Gliding Medal recipients
People from State College, Pennsylvania
Pennsylvania State University alumni
Living people
1937 births
American people of German descent
American aviation record holders
Holocaust denial